Gimlet Creek is a stream in the U.S. state of South Dakota.

Gimlet Creek was so named on account of its irregular watercourse ("crooked as a gimlet").

See also
List of rivers of South Dakota

References

Rivers of Lawrence County, South Dakota
Rivers of Pennington County, South Dakota
Rivers of South Dakota